Felipe Rose (born 12 January 1954) is an American musician who was an original member of the disco group the Village People. While in the group, he performed as a Native American character - usually wearing a costume consisting of an imitation war bonnet, loincloth and theatrical face paint. Rose was a member of the group from 1977 until 2017, when the name of the group was turned over to original lead singer Victor Willis. Rose subsequently launched a solo career and released the single "Going Back to My Roots" in 2018.

Early years
Felipe Ortiz Rose was born in Manhattan to a Puerto Rican mother. He currently claims Lakota/Taino descent, but at other times has said he is Apache. He was raised in Brooklyn, where he displayed an interest in the arts during his childhood. His mother was his main inspiration as she herself had been a dancer for the Copacabana during the 1940s and 1950s.

Village People

Rose began as a nightclub dancer. He describes being encouraged by an aunt to begin dancing "in his father's tribal regalia", which he says led to his costume in the Village People. Rose was working as a dancer and a bartender in the gay New York discotheque The Anvil, dressed "as an [American] Indian" when he was discovered by French producer Jacques Morali and executive producer Henri Belolo and so became the first recruit for Village People.

In 1977, Village People had their first hit with "San Francisco", although this song became a hit only in the United Kingdom. Then in 1978 they had their first hits in the U.S. with "Macho Man" followed by "YMCA"

He is a member of the band's board of directors, called Sixuvus Ltd ("six of us" - named for the six members of the  Village People).

Solo career
In 2000, Rose began to work on his solo career. His single "Trails of Tears" won a NAMMY (Native American Music Awards) for Best Historical Recording. In 2002, Rose was the opening act of the fifth Annual Native American Music Awards celebrated at the Marcus Amphitheatre in Milwaukee, Wisconsin. His media company is the "Tomahawk Group".

Rose has appeared in the movies Can't Stop the Music (1980), The Best of Village People (1993), and Feathers and Leathers: The Story of the Village People (1999). He also participated in the 2000 documentary, Village People: The E! True Hollywood Story.

Personal life
For a time Rose lived in Richmond, Virginia, and briefly in Jersey City, New Jersey, though he found it to be too crowded. In a 2008 interview, he stated that approximately four or five years prior, he moved to Asbury Park, New Jersey on the advice of several friends who lived there, saying, "So I came down and I just fell in love with the shore... I love the diversity of Asbury because it brings everyone together. There is a very large gay and lesbian community here, but the diversity of artists is amazing; it’s become very bohemian."

Notes

See also

List of Puerto Ricans

References

External links
 
 
 

American dance musicians
American disco musicians
American LGBT singers
Living people
Musicians from Brooklyn
American musicians of Puerto Rican descent
Village People members
People from Asbury Park, New Jersey
People from Monmouth County, New Jersey
American gay musicians
LGBT Hispanic and Latino American people
American people who self-identify as being of Native American descent
20th-century LGBT people
21st-century LGBT people
1954 births